Baima is a town of Anju District, Suining, Sichuan, People's Republic of China, situated about  southwest of downtown. , it has three residential communities and 22 villages under its administration:
Neighborhoods
Shunhe Community
Pingning Community
Wuyanjing Community

Villages
Baiguoshu Village
Huatianba Village
Chenjiagou Village
Zhipingsi Village
Xiaolongtang Village
Baita Village
Baimamiao Village
Qingfeng Village
Baoquangou Village
Qingliangsi Village
Shanlinsi Village
Lianglukou Village
Sifangjing Village
Pilusi Village
Mazitan Village
Huangtongpo Village
Buyun Village
Tongzhuwan Village
Huangyanjing Village
Hebianjing Village
Tandongzi Village
Citongya Village

See also 
 List of township-level divisions of Sichuan

References 

Towns in Sichuan
Suining